Luigi Stucchi (14 August 1941 – 20 December 2022) was an Italian prelate of the Catholic Church, who served as an auxiliary bishop of the Archdiocese of Milan from 2004 to 2020.

Stucchi was born in Sulbiate, Italy in 1941 and was ordained to the priesthood in 1966. He served as titular bishop of Horrea and was auxiliary bishop of the Archdiocese of Milan from 2004 until his retirement in 2020.

References

1941 births
2022 deaths
21st-century Roman Catholic bishops
Italian Roman Catholic bishops
Italian Roman Catholic titular bishops
Bishops appointed by Pope John Paul II
People from the Province of Monza e Brianza